PSW may refer to:

 PSW Science, the oldest scientific society in Washington, D.C.
 Personal Support Worker, Canada
 PlayStation World, a UK magazine
 Program status word, a control register in IBM mainframe computers
 Baillie–PSW primality test in mathematics
 Part Submission Warrant in production part approval process
 Post Study Work Visa, UK